Yousuf Karsh,  FRPS (December 23, 1908 – July 13, 2002) was a Canadian photographer known for his portraits of notable individuals. He has been described as one of the greatest portrait photographers of the 20th century.

An Armenian genocide survivor, Karsh migrated to Canada as a refugee. By the 1930s he established himself as a significant photographer in Ottawa, where he lived most of his adult life, though he traveled extensively for work. His iconic 1941 photograph of Winston Churchill was a breakthrough point in his 60-year career, through which he took numerous photos of known political leaders, men and women of arts and sciences. Over 20 photos by Karsh appeared on the cover of Life magazine, until he retired in 1993.

Early life and arrival in Canada
Yousuf Karsh was born to Armenian parents Amsih Karsh (1872–1962), a merchant, and Bahia Nakash (1883–1958), on December 23, 1908, in Mardin, Diyarbekir Vilayet, Ottoman Empire. His father was Catholic, while his mother was Protestant. He had two brothers: Jamil and Malak; the latter was also a photographer. His illiterate father travelled extensively to trade furniture, rugs, spices, while his mother was "an educated woman, a rarity in those days, and was extremely well read, particularly in her beloved Bible."

The city's Armenian population was largely Arabic-speaking. He grew up during the Armenian genocide, during which some of his family were murdered. "My recollections of those days comprise a strange mixture of blood and beauty, of persecution and peace," he later wrote. Karsh and his family escaped to a refugee camp in Aleppo, Syria in 1922 in a month-long journey with a Kurdish caravan. The Economist noted in their obituary of Karsh that he "thought of himself as an Armenian" and, according to Vartan Gregorian, "Although he was proud to be Canadian, Karsh was equally proud to be Armenian."

Karsh was sent to Canada by his family. He arrived in Halifax, Nova Scotia on December 31, 1923, by ship from Beirut. He immediately moved to Sherbrooke, Quebec to live with his maternal uncle George Nakashian (Nakash), a portrait photographer. He attended Sherbrooke High School for a year and his "formal education was over almost before it began." By the time he reached Canada, he "spoke little French, and less English" and "had no money and little schooling." Karsh worked for, and was taught photography by his uncle. He gave Karsh a Box Brownie camera. From 1928 to 1931, Karsh apprenticed in Boston, Massachusetts for John H. Garo, the most prominent Armenian photographer in America at the time who had made a name for himself photographing Boston celebrities.

Career
Karsh settled in Ottawa, initially working for photographer John Powis. Karsh opened his first studio in 1932. It was located on the second floor of a building at 130 Sparks Street, which was later named the Hardy Arcade. He remained there until 1972, when he moved to the Château Laurier. He was known professionally as "Karsh of Ottawa", which was also his signature. He achieved initial success by capturing the attention of Canadian Prime Minister Mackenzie King, who helped Karsh arrange photography sessions with visiting dignitaries. Karsh was also introduced into the Rideau Hall social circle, and his portraits of Lord Bessborough, Governor General from 1931 to 1935, and his wife were widely published. Karsh became a member of the Ottawa Camera Club and exhibited works in the International Salon of Photography exhibitions held at the National Gallery of Canada from 1934 onwards.

Throughout his life, Karsh photographed "anyone who was anyone." When asked why he almost exclusively captured famous people, he replied, "I am working with the world's most remarkable cross-section of people. I do believe it's the minority who make the world go around, not the majority." He once also jokingly remarked, "I do it for my own immortality." By the time he retired in 1992, more than 20 of his photos had appeared on the cover of Life magazine. Karsh's photos were known for their use of dramatic lighting, which became the hallmark of his portrait style. He had studied it with both Garo in Boston and at the Ottawa Little Theatre, of which he was a member. Before a sitting, Karsh researched his subjects and talked to them.

His 1941 photo of Winston Churchill, the British Prime Minister, brought him international prominence. The photograph was taken on December 30, 1941, in the Speaker's chamber of the Speaker of the House of Commons in the Canadian Parliament in Ottawa after Churchill delivered a speech on World War II to the Canadian members of the parliament. It was arranged by Canadian Prime Minister William Lyon Mackenzie King. Churchill is particularly noted for his posture and facial expression, which have been compared to the wartime feelings that prevailed in the UK: persistence in the face of an all-conquering enemy. The photo session was short and, just before exposure, Karsh moved towards Churchill and removed the cigar which was in his mouth. Churchill was miffed and showed his displeasure in the portrait. 

The photo, which according to The Economist is the "most reproduced portrait in the history of photography", has been described as one of the "most iconic portraits ever shot". USC Fisher Museum of Art described it as a "defiant and scowling portrait [which] became an instant icon of Britain's stand against fascism." It appeared on the cover of the May 21, 1945, issue of Life, which bought it for $100. One of the first prints of the original currently hangs on the wall in the Speaker's chamber of the Speaker of the House of Commons of Canada, where the iconic image was photographed.  It is considered Churchill's most famous picture and appears on the Bank of England £5 note. On August 19, 2022, it was discovered that a Karsh-signed portrait residing in the reading room of the Château Laurier, Ottawa, had been stolen and replaced with a fake. A staff member noticed that the frame on the portrait did not match the other five portraits donated by Karsh in 1998. Jerry Fielder, the director of Karsh's estate, immediately recognized that the Karsh signature on the portrait was a forgery. Ottawa Police are investigating the theft. 

During World War II, Karsh photographed political and military leaders and began capturing photos of writers, actors, artists, musicians, scientists,  and celebrities in the post-war period. His 1957 portrait of the American novelist Ernest Hemingway, taken at Hemingway's Cuban home Finca Vigía, is another well-known photo by Karsh. According to Amanda Hopkinson it made Hemingway look like the hero of his 1952 novel The Old Man and the Sea. His other notable portraits include George Bernard Shaw at an old age (1943), Dwight D. Eisenhower as a five-star general and Supreme Commander of the Allied Expeditionary Force (1946), American artist Georgia O'Keeffe in her New Mexico studio (1956), and Soviet leader Nikita Khrushchev swathed in fur (1963).

Besides portraits of the famous, Karsh photographed assembly line workers in Windsor, Ontario, commissioned by the Ford Motor Company of Canada. He also photographed landscapes of Rome and the Holy Land to be included in books in collaboration with Bishop Fulton J. Sheen, an annual poster for the Muscular Dystrophy Association, and other works. 

Karsh closed his studio at Château Laurier in June 1992. His penultimate sittings in May 1993 were with President Bill Clinton and First Lady Hillary.

He was a visiting professor at Ohio University and at Emerson College in Boston.

Gallery

Personal life 

Karsh's first marriage was to Solange Gauthier (1902−1961) in 1939. He met her at the Ottawa Little Theatre in 1933, where she was a star. Gauthier was born in Tours, France and migrated to Canada as a young girl. They initially moved into her apartment and in 1940, into an Art Deco home called Little Wings on the Rideau River just outside Ottawa. She died in January 1961 of cancer.

His second marriage was to Estrellita Maria Nachbar, a medical writer 21 years his junior, in August 1962. Their wedding was officiated by Fulton J. Sheen, Auxiliary Bishop of the Catholic Archdiocese of New York. From 1972 to 1992 they lived in a third-floor suite at Château Laurier, Ottawa and maintained Little Wings and an apartment and studio in Manhattan. They had no children.

Retirement and death
Karsh moved to Boston in 1997. He died on July 13, 2002, at Brigham and Women's Hospital in Boston after complications following surgery. A private funeral was held in Ottawa. He was interred in Notre-Dame Cemetery in Ottawa.

Recognition

Karsh has been recognized as Canada's leading portrait photographer. In general, he is recognized as one of the best-known and great portrait photographers of the 20th century. The Economist wrote upon his death that Karsh was "for half a century perhaps the greatest portrait photographer in the monumental manner". The website of the Governor General of Canada describes him as the "pre-eminent portrait photographer of the twentieth century". The Metropolitan Museum of Art described him as "one of the greatest portrait photographers of the twentieth century [who] achieved a distinct style in his theatrical lighting". The Canadian Encyclopedia noted that his portraits "have come to represent the public images of major international figures of politics, science, and culture in the twentieth century".

By the time of his death, his work was included in numerous museum collections including the Metropolitan Museum of Art, Museum of Modern Art (both in New York), National Gallery of Canada, National Portrait Gallery in London, National Museum of Modern Art in Tokyo, Art Institute of Chicago, Saint Louis Art Museum, Muscarelle Museum of Art, George Eastman Museum, and elsewhere. In 1987 the National Archives of Canada acquired the complete collection of Karsh items, including the negatives, prints and transparencies produced and retained by Karsh since 1933. The current Library and Archives Canada collection has 355,000 items in its Karsh collection, including all of his 150,000 negatives, kept at a facility in Gatineau, Quebec. Karsh's widow Estrellita gifted more than 100 photographic prints to the National Portrait Gallery in Washington, D.C.

He was a member of the Royal Canadian Academy of Arts and an honorary fellow of the Royal Photographic Society (UK).

On June 9, 2017, a bust of Karsh by Canadian-Armenian sculptor Megerditch Tarakdjian was unveiled before Château Laurier, Ottawa. It depicts Karsh with his famous camera and is a gift to Canada from the people of Armenia on the occasion of the 25th anniversary of the establishment of diplomatic relations between the two countries and the 150th anniversary of Canada. Among attendees were George Furey, the Speaker of the Senate, and Arif Virani, the Parliamentary Secretary to the Minister of Canadian Heritage.

The Karsh Award, dedicated to Yousuf and his brother Malak Karsh, is awarded by the City of Ottawa every two years to an established professional artist for outstanding artistic work in a photo-based medium.

Awards
Golden Plate Award of the American Academy of Achievement (1961)
Order of Canada: Officer (1967), Companion (1990)
Canada Council Medal (1965)
Achievement and Life Award, Encyclopædia Britannica (1980)
Gold Medal of Merit, National Society of Arts and Letters (1991)

Karsh was awarded honorary degrees from Dartmouth College (1961), Ohio University (1968), Tufts University (D.F.A., 1981), Syracuse University (D.F.A., 1986), Ohio State University (Doctor of Humane Letters, 1996), University of Hartford (1980), University of Massachusetts at Amherst (1979), Bishop's University (1969), Emerson College, Queen's University, Carleton University, Mount Allison University, Dawson College.

Karsh has been inducted into the International Photography Hall of Fame and Museum.

Publications

Faces of Destiny (1946)
Portraits of Greatness (1959)
In Search of Greatness (1962)
Karsh Portfolio (1967)
Faces of Our Time (1971)
Karsh Portraits (1976)
Karsh Canadians (1978)
Karsh: A Fifty-Year Retrospective (1983)
Karsh: A Sixty-Year Retrospective (1996)
Heroes of Light and Shadow (2001)

References
Notes

Citations

External links

 Official Yousuf Karsh Website
 Yousuf Karsh Profile at Photogpedia
 Yousuf Karsh fonds (R613) at Library and Archives Canada
Yousuf Karsh Collection at the National Gallery of Canada, Ottawa, Ontario

Canadian people of Armenian descent
Canadian expatriates in the United States
Companions of the Order of Canada
Artists from Ottawa
Artists from Quebec
People from Sherbrooke
Ethnic Armenian photographers
Armenians from the Ottoman Empire
Canadian portrait photographers
Emigrants from the Ottoman Empire to Canada
1908 births
2002 deaths
People from Mardin
Members of the Royal Canadian Academy of Arts
Armenian genocide survivors
Applicants for refugee status in Canada
Burials at Notre-Dame Cemetery (Ottawa)